The 2015 Conference USA Football Championship Game determined the 2015 football champion of Conference USA (C-USA) and was held on December 5, 2015, in Bowling Green, Kentucky. The game was hosted by Western Kentucky (WKU), winner of the conference's East division, and also featured Southern Miss, winner of the conference's West division. This was the 11th edition of the Conference USA Football Championship Game and was won by WKU, 45–28.

Teams

West Division Champions
The winner of Southern Miss vs. Louisiana Tech on November 28 decided the West division champion. Southern Miss won 58-24.

East Division Champions
The winner of Marshall vs. Western Kentucky on November 27 decided the East division champion. WKU won 49–28.

References

Championship
Conference USA Football Championship Game
Southern Miss Golden Eagles football games
Western Kentucky Hilltoppers football games
Conference USA Football Championship Game
Conference USA Football